The canton of Bourbon-l'Archambault is an administrative division in central France. At the French canton reorganisation which came into effect in March 2015, the canton was expanded from 8 to 29 communes (2 of which merged into the new commune Meaulne-Vitray):
 
Ainay-le-Château
Bourbon-l'Archambault
Braize
Buxières-les-Mines
Cérilly
Château-sur-Allier
Couleuvre
Couzon
Franchesse
Isle-et-Bardais
Lételon
Limoise
Lurcy-Lévis
Meaulne-Vitray
Neure
Pouzy-Mésangy
Saint-Aubin-le-Monial
Saint-Bonnet-Tronçais
Saint-Hilaire
Saint-Léopardin-d'Augy
Saint-Plaisir
Theneuille
Urçay
Valigny
Le Veurdre
Vieure
Le Vilhain
Ygrande

Demographics

See also
Cantons of the Allier department 
Communes of France

References

Cantons of Allier